Fotios "Fotis" Takianos (Greek: Φώτης Τακιανός; born April 14, 1969) is a Greek former professional basketball player and current Greek professional basketball coach, most recently for Larisa of the Greek Basket League.

Coaching career
After retiring from playing basketball, Fotis Takianos became a full-time basketball coach. He started by serving as an assistant coach (2004-2007) at Iraklis, A.E.K. B.C. and P.A.O.K. BC in the Greek Basket League, before he was appointed as the head coach of Panorama B.C. for the first time in March 2007 in Greek 2nd Division. In Greek 2nd Division, he has also served Rethymno Cretan Kings B.C., KAO Dramas, O.F.I B.C., Doxa Lefkadas.

In 2004, he travelled in Memphis to participate to the Coaching Camp, Pre-Season Camp Memphis Grizzlies/University of MEMPHIS/University of Kentucky from where he earns significant experience.

In the highlights of his coaching career, for the 2016–17 season, as the Head coach guided Doxa Lefkadas to grant a wildcard to play in the top-tier level Greek Basket League for the first time.
Also, under his coaching instructions Rethymno Cretan Kings B.C. ended 2007-2008 season as a Runner Up.

Fotis Takianos has also served Greek Basket League as the Head coach to Trikala Aries B.C.

His international career in 1st Divisions included Head coaching directions to Bashkimi Prizren of Qatar,  Apollon Limassol B.C. of Cyprus, Bashkimi Prizren and KB Rahoveci of Kosovo.

On November 18, 2021, Takianos returned to Greece for Larisa, replacing Nikos Papanikolopoulos. He led the team for the first time to the Greek Basket League playoffs, finishing the regular season in 6th place and reaching the playoff semi-finals, where the team managed to win two games against favorites Panathinaikos.

Professional career
During his professional playing career, Fotis Takianos played with the following clubs: Aris, P.A.O.K. BC, Makedonikos B.C.

In the highlights of his playing career, he was a player of P.A.O.K. BC when they won the FIBA Korać Cup in 1994 defeating Stefanel Trieste in the final in the Thessaloniki 75-66 (W).

Awards and accomplishments

Coaching career

 Coach of the year 2022, Greek Basket League

Playing career
FIBA Korać Cup Champion:
1994

References
Οι Έλληνες προπονητές που διδάσκουν μπάσκετ στην Ασία
Τακιανός: Με κάνει αισιόδοξο η καθημερινότητα της Λάρισας
Τακιανός: Οι παίκτες έκαναν κατάθεση ψυχής
Τακιανός: Μεγάλη νίκη, είπαμε να αφήσουμε την καρδιά μας στο ματς
Συνεχίζει στη Δόξα Λευκάδας ο Τακιανός
Korać Cup 1994-94

External links
Fotis Takianos at eurobasket.com

Fotis Takianos at tracenchase.com

1969 births
Living people
Basketball players from Thessaloniki
Greek basketball coaches
Larisa B.C. coaches
P.A.O.K. BC coaches
AEK B.C. coaches
OFI Crete B.C. coaches
P.A.O.K. BC players
Makedonikos B.C. players
Aris B.C. players
Greek Basket League players
Greek men's basketball players